New Asia Middle School, abbreviated as NAMS, is an aided secondary school founded in 1973. It is located at Farm Road, Kau Pui Lung, Kowloon, Hong Kong. The school was founded by Prof. Ch'ien Mu as a non-profit-making Chinese secondary school at the former campus of New Asia College, after the latter became a member college of the Chinese University of Hong Kong and moved to Ma Liu Shui, Sha Tin. The spirit of the school is to promote Chinese culture, revive Chinese ethics, and cultivate the New Asian qualities of students.

Recently, the school uses Chinese as the main medium of instruction, offering four classes each from Form 1 to Form 6. In the 1970s, the members of the school board included Prof. Tang Chun-i and Prof. Yu Ying-shih etc. The school receives positive evaluation of students' polite behaviour from shop owners as well as the staff working in the vicinity.

School administration
The founder of the school was Prof. Ch'ien Mu. After their retirement from college as sinologists, Prof. Mou Zongsan and Prof. Xu Fuguan helped found the school. The school is currently sponsored by New Asia Educational Cultural Association. In 2007, the IMC was established in accordance with the Hong Kong Education Ordinance to promote the effective development of school administration.

Members of the school board
In the 1970s, the members of the school board included Prof. Yu Ying-shih, Prof. Xun Guo-dong (孫國棟) and Prof. Tang Chun-i etc., and most of them were historians or philosophers. Later, Mr. Heung Shu Fai (香樹輝), a famous banker in Hong Kong, became one of the managers of the school.

Supervisors
Recently, Mr. Wat Kai Chau is the supervisor.

Principals

Vice principals

Campus environment
Its campus consists of four complexes: Block A with a library and the New Asia Institute inside, Block B, Block C and Block S (the Pillar).

See also
New Asia College
Education in Hong Kong
List of secondary schools in Hong Kong

References

External links 

New Asia Middle School alumni
New Asia Middle School Facebook

Secondary schools in Hong Kong
Confucian schools in Hong Kong
1973 establishments in Hong Kong
Educational institutions established in 1973